Julie Moos (born 1966) is a Canadian photographer and art writer.

Moos' work was included in the 2002 Whitney Biennial at the Whitney Museum of American Art in New York and curated by Lawrence Rinder. Moos's work has been shown at the Birmingham (Alabama) Museum of Art, the Honolulu Museum of Art Spalding House (formerly known as The Contemporary Museum, Honolulu), the Mint Museum of Art, Norton Museum of Art, the Renaissance Society of Chicago and elsewhere.

Moos's approach to photography explores worlds of opposites. By pairing subjects side by side in various series including "Friends and Enemies" and "Domestics", she allows the viewer to compare individuals through an unrestrained formalism that asks us to see the equality of all people.

Series

Monsanto 
In a series titled "Monsanto", Moos photographs American farmers who cultivate their crops using Genetically Modified Organisms (GMO's) manufactured by the Monsanto Company. The series was created during her residence at the St. Louis Forum for Contemporary Art located near Monsanto's headquarters. Moos chose to represent her subjects in an objective manner despite the highly controversial topic of biogenetic engineering. Her portraits offered a straightforward, unbiased presentation of the farmer's work, the land, and the corporation supporting them. While the series included photos that followed her previous work's pattern by pairing two people in one photo, "Monsanto" veered slightly by adding heighted focus to the surrounding landscape and the presence of the unseen corporation. This series is based on James Agee's article "Let Us Now Praise Famous Men", published as a book with photographs by Walker Evans.

Friends and Enemies 
The series features couples who fall into one of two categories: best friends or worst enemies. Moos places the two subjects against non-descript backgrounds providing no extra evidence and allowing the viewer conclude the relationship between the couple.

Personal life 
Julie Moos is the wife of contemporary art curator David Moos.

References

External links
Whitney Museum of American Art | Biennial -- 2002
Contemporary Art Museum, St. Louis, Missouri
University of North Carolina at Chapel Hill, North Carolina
The "Hat Ladies" of New Pilgrim Baptist Church
Essay on "Monsanto Series'
Moos' work at the Contemporary Museum, Honolulu, Hawaii

Canadian portrait photographers
1966 births
Living people
Place of birth missing (living people)
Artists from Alabama
Canadian women photographers
Art writers